AZS AWF Warszawa, known in English as AZS AWF Warsaw, was a Polish men's volleyball team based in Warsaw, founded in 1949 as a university team (AZS) and dissolved in 1995. Fourteen times Polish Champion and three–time Polish Cup winner. The most successful Polish volleyball club of the 20th century based on the number of the league titles.

Honours

Domestic
 Polish Championship
Winners (14): 1952, 1953, 1953–54, 1954–55, 1955–56, 1956–57, 1957–58, 1958–59, 1959–60, 1960–61, 1962–63, 1964–65, 1965–66, 1967–68

 Polish Cup
Winners (3): 1953, 1953–54, 1954

International
 CEV European Champions Cup 
Semifinalists (1): 1959–60

References

External links
 Team profile at Volleybox.net

Polish volleyball clubs
Sport in Warsaw
Volleyball clubs established in 1949
1949 establishments in Poland